Kris McCaddon was the second guitarist for the metalcore band, Society's Finest and lead guitarist for Demon Hunter. He was also the vocalist for the bands Embodyment and The Famine.

History

McCaddon's career started in 1994 when he joined the band Embodyment. They released their debut album, Embrace the Eternal, in 1997; it featured guest vocals by Living Sacrifice vocalist Bruce Fitzhugh. Embrace the Eternal would later be re-released by their record label, Solid State Records. He left the band in 2000 before recording their second album, The Narrow Scope of Things. McCaddon started the band, along with Joshua Ashworth, Rob Pruett, Joel Bailey, and Chad Wilburn, Society's Finest. In 2000 they released an EP titled Private Conflicts & Suicides. Their debut album, The Journey...So Far, was released on Solid State Records in May 2000.

In 2003 they took a short break, during which McCaddon decided to leave Society's Finest, and went on to join Demon Hunter. After leaving Society's Finest and Embodyment, Ryan Clark and Don Clark, formerly of Training for Utopia, recruited him, Jesse Sprinkle, formerly of Poor Old Lu, and Jon Dunn (Who would later join Soul Embraced) to join their project, Demon Hunter. Demon Hunter already had an album before he joined. On this album McCaddon had contributed by photography. On his Demon Hunter debut, Summer of Darkness, was great success. In 2005, Ethan Luck, formerly of The O.C. Supertones and Project 86, replaced McCaddon. In 2006, former Embodyment members, Mark Garza (drums) and Andrew Godwin (guitar), contacted McCaddon and said they wanted to play metal again. McCaddon contacted former Society's Finest member, Nick Nowell (bass) and asked him to join their new project, The Famine. Though McCaddon knew people would compare the Famine to Embodyment, he stated that "We started The Famine because we wanted to get away from the stuff we were playing with Embodyment...".

In 2007, they signed to Solid State Records and released their debut EP, The Famine. In 2008, they released their debut album, The Raven and the Reaping. In 2010, McCaddon departed The Famine and Nick Nowell took over vocals. The Famine later broke-up in 2011. McCaddon is a former employee of Takehold Records and Tooth & Nail Records.

Bands 

 Embodyment – vocals (1994–1999)
 Society's Finest – guitar (1997–2001)
 Demon Hunter – guitar (2002–2005)
 The Famine – vocals (2006–2010)

Discography 

Embodyment
 Embrace the Eternal (1998)

Society's Finest
 Private Conflicts & Suicides (2000)
 The Journey...So Far (2000)

Demon Hunter
 Summer of Darkness (2004)

The Famine
 The Famine (2007)
 The Raven and the Reaping (2008)

Other credits 

 Regulate the Chemicals by Twothirtyeight (art direction, design)
 This is Solid State Vol.2 (compilation by Solid State Records with Society's Finest)
 Throwing Myself by Luti-Kriss (art direction, design)
 Stay, Restored, and Beyond Measure by Jeremy Camp (art direction, design)
 What it is to Burn by Finch (art direction, design)
 Songs for the Living by Embodyment (art direction, design)
 Kings by Shiloh (art direction, design)
 The Right Amount by Bon Voyage (art direction, design)
 How to Start a Fire by Further Seems Forever (art direction, design)
 G.I. gantic by Grand Incredible (art direction, design, photography)
 The Beauty of Simplicity by Telecast (Photography)
 They're Only Chasing Safety by Underoath (art direction, design)
 Set it Off by Thousand Foot Krutch (re-release photography)
 The Weak's End and Are You Listening? by Emery (photography)
 Collide by Skillet (photography)
 The Funeral of God by Zao (design)
 Summer of Darkness by Demon Hunter (Guitar, photography)
 Never Take Friendship Personal by Anberlin (artwork)
 Deadbeat Sweetheartbeat by The Juliana Theory (art directions, design, illustrations)
 The Jaws of Life by Fine China (design)
 I See You Through the Glass by Gods (design)
 Setting Roots for the Winter by Eso-Charis (illustration, design)
 About a Burning Fire by Blindside (photography)
 I Am the Portuguese Blues by Starflyer 59 (art work, design)
 Three-album Collection: Believer/Strong Tower/Kutless by Kutless (photography)

References

 Kris McCaddon credits on AllMusic

External links
 
 

American heavy metal guitarists
Living people
Year of birth missing (living people)
Demon Hunter members